Kureha may refer to:

 Kureha Chemical Industries, a Japanese chemical manufacturer 
 Kureha Station, a railway station in Toyama, Japan
 "Kureha", a single by Onmyo-Za

Fictional characters 
 Kureha Akabane, in Night Wizard!
 Kureha Fujishima, in After School Nightmare
 Kureha Koushou, Baki the Grappler
 Aya Kureha, in The Betrayal Knows My Name
 Ikushima Kureha, Broken Angels (manga)
 Touka Kureha, in Shining Tears X Wind,  Shining Wind and Shining Blade
 Kureha Suminoya, in Sound of the Sky
 Kureha Suzuka, in Tokko (manga)
 Kureha Tsuwabuki, in Kaze no Stigma
 Kureha, in Sword Art Online: Fatal Bullet
 Kureha, in Sound Voltex